This is a recap of the 2012–13 season for the Professional Bowlers Association (PBA) Tour. It was the tour's 54th season, and the fourth straight season in which all of the North American fall events are condensed into the PBA World Series of Bowling (WSOB). The season consisted of 34 individual title events, plus a "PBA League" team title event. The PBA billed 2012–13 as a "super season", running longer than one full year, in preparation for a return to a calendar-year season format for 2014.

This is also the first season since 2003–04 in which all events are open to any PBA member, as the Tour has abandoned the "exempt" tour format that began in the 2004–05 season.  While "exempt" status for touring players has been dropped, the PBA Tour will still have a points system which affects a few events as well as "Touring 1" and "Touring 2" player statuses.

Tournament schedule and recaps 
For the fourth season in a row, the PBA held the fall North American events in one location at the GEICO PBA World Series of Bowling (WSOB).  Preliminary rounds of the televised tournaments were November 3–7, with television tapings on November 10–11.  All of the events were held at the South Point Casino's bowling center in Las Vegas, Nevada.  The season will run an unprecedented 14 months, concluding with a second PBA World Series of Bowling in the fall of 2013.  This is in preparation for a move to a calendar year national tour format in 2014.  In all, the 2012–13 season will have 40 title events, including 15 international tour stops. The international stops are part of the World Bowling Tour (WBT), but will award PBA titles to winners who are full-fledged PBA members at the time of the tournament (including members of international PBA organizations).

The World Series of Bowling for 2012 included four stand-alone title tournaments (Cheetah Championship, Viper Championship, Chameleon Championship and Scorpion Championship), plus the PBA World Championship major. The qualifying rounds of each stand-alone "animal pattern" event (8 games each for a total of 32 games) also served as the initial qualifying for the PBA World Championship.  The PBA World Championship then held match-play for the top 24 bowlers on November 8–9. The WBT Men's and WBT Women's final rounds were also taped at the WSOB for a later TV broadcast.  The WBT Men's final is now a PBA title event (it was not in 2011). All final rounds at the 2012 WSOB returned to a stepladder format, after an "eliminator" format was used for several events in 2011.

Following the WSOB, the Round1 Japan Cup invitational tournament (formerly Dydo Japan Cup) took place November 29 – December 2 in Japan. This tournament, which typically includes a number of PBA Tour players and is a PBA title event, was not held in 2011 due to the earthquake and resulting tsunami in Japan.

After three more international tour stops, the "PBA Winter Swing" commenced in North America with four tournaments in Allen Park, Michigan held January 19–28, 2013. The "PBA Summer Swing" took place May 19 – June 2, with four full tournaments held in and around Milwaukee, Wisconsin, plus a made-for-TV "King of the Swing" stepladder final. The remaining three major tournaments are spread out through 2013 (USBC Masters in February, Barbasol PBA Tournament of Champions in March, and U.S. Open in July).

Tournament summary
Below is a schedule of events for the 2012–13 PBA Tour season. Major tournaments are in bold. Career PBA title numbers for winners are shown in parenthesis (x).

C: broadcast on CBS Sports Network
E: broadcast on ESPN

References

External links
2012–13 Season Schedule

Professional Bowlers Association seasons
2013 in bowling
2012 in bowling